The 25th Hour is a 1967 anti-war drama film directed by Henri Verneuil, produced by Carlo Ponti and starring Anthony Quinn and Virna Lisi. The film is based on the bestselling novel by C. Virgil Gheorghiu and follows the troubles experienced by a Romanian peasant couple caught up in World War II.

Plot
In a small Transylvanian village, a local police constable frames Johann Moritz on charges of being Jewish because Moritz's wife Suzanna has refused the constable's advances. Moritz is sent to a Romanian concentration camp as a Jew, where he is known as Jacob Moritz. He escapes to Hungary with some Jewish prisoners, but the Hungarians imprison them for being citizens of Romania, an enemy country. The Hungarian authorities eventually send them to Germany to fill German requests for foreign laborers. Moritz is spotted by an SS officer who designates him as an Aryan German-Romanian, freeing him from the labor camp and forcing him to join the Waffen-SS. After the war, Moritz is brutally beaten by the Soviets for having been a member of the Waffen-SS. He is then arrested and prosecuted as a war criminal by the Americans. Eventually he is released and reunited with his wife and sons in occupied Germany.

The film is based on the novel of the same name by Constantin Virgil Gheorghiu. The storyline includes Hungary's alliance with Nazi Germany, the forced cession of Bessarabia and Northern Bukovina to the Soviet Union in 1940 and subsequent events in Central Europe during and after World War II.

Cast
Anthony Quinn as Johann Moritz
Virna Lisi as Suzanna Moritz
Serge Reggiani as Traïan Koruga
Grégoire Aslan as Nicolai Dobresco
Marius Goring as Oberst Müller
Michael Redgrave as defence lawyer
Marcel Dalio as Strul (as Dalio)
Jacques Marin as the soldier at Debresco
Françoise Rosay as Mrs. Nagy
 as a prisoner in the truck
 as a prisoner in the truck
Jean Desailly as the minister's chief of staff
Michael Redgrave as Johann's lawyer
Albert Rémy as Joseph Grenier
Jan Werich as Sgt. Constantin
 as the German officer
Robert Beatty as Colonel Greenfield
Harold Goldblatt as Isaac Nagy
Alexander Knox as Prosecutor
Liam Redmond as Father Koruga
Meier Tzelniker as Abramovici
Kenneth J. Warren as Inspector Varga
John Le Mesurier as Tribunal president

Reception 
In a contemporary review for The New York Times, critic Bosley Crowther panned The 25th Hour as "... such a tasteless and pointless hodgepodge of deadly serious and crudely comic elements, of tragic historical allusions grossly garbled in specious movie terms, that it looms large as one of the most disreputable and embarrassing films in recent years ..." Crowther was especially critical of Anthony Quinn's character and performance: "... [T]here is no real continuity or real sincerity in the nature of the man. He ranges from an image of the poignant victim to one of a genial simpleton. And in all his shuddering misadventures, so darkly shadowed by the facts of history, he manifests no awareness of relation to the suffering of others or even a point of view. The only philosophical reaction registered by Mr. Quinn—or provided by his script writers—is one of confusion that this is happening to him. The impression transmitted by all this is one of utter insensitivity."

Los Angeles Times film critic Philip K. Scheuer wrote: "One has to keep telling oneself what a good actor Anthony Quinn is in order to sustain interest ... For this odyssey of a wandering non-Jew takes up to 2 1/4 hours to say what it has to say, and even this doesn't add up to much which is new ..."

References

External links
 
 
 

1967 films
1960s English-language films
English-language Italian films
1960s Romanian-language films
1960s French-language films
Films directed by Henri Verneuil
Films set in Romania
Metro-Goldwyn-Mayer films
Films based on Romanian novels
Films scored by Georges Delerue
Films scored by Maurice Jarre
French war drama films
English-language French films
French multilingual films
Italian multilingual films
Italian war drama films
Anti-war films about World War II
1960s war drama films
Yugoslav multilingual films
English-language Yugoslav films
1960s multilingual films
Films with screenplays by Wolf Mankowitz
Yugoslav war drama films
1967 drama films
Films set in Transylvania
Italian World War II films
French World War II films
Yugoslav World War II films
1960s Italian films
1960s French films